Muthuswami Dikshita (24 March 1775 – 21 October 1835) or Dikshitar was a South Indian poet and composer and is one of the musical trinity of Carnatic music. His compositions, of which around 500 are commonly known, are noted for their elaborate and poetic descriptions of Hindu gods and temples and for capturing the essence of the raga forms through the vainika (veena) style that emphasises gamakas. They are typically in a slower speed (chowka kala). He is also known by his signature name of Guruguha which is also his mudra (and can be found in each of his songs). His compositions are widely sung and played in classical concerts of Carnatic music.

Muthuswami Dikshitar composed many kritis in groups. The following lists describe those groups and compositions that belong to each group.

Maha Ganapati Krithis 

Deekshitar composed 26 songs in temples of Lord Ganesha in around Tiruvarur.

Guruguha (Subramanya) Krithis

Guruguha Vibhakti Krithis 

These are the Guruguha Vibhakti Kritis.

Other Krithis on Guruguha

Devi Kritis

Kamalamba Navavarna Kritis 
Here are the 11 songs in praise of Goddess Kamalamba.

Neelayadakshi Kritis 
The Following kriti is on Goddess Neelayadakshi Ambal of Nagappatinam (Nagai Karonam).

Nilotpalamba Vibhakti Krithis 
The Following kritis are in the Nilotpalamba Vibhakti Krithis set.

Mayuram - Abhayamba Navavarana Krithis

Kanchi - Kamakshi Devi Krithis

Madurai Maduramba(Meenakshi) Vibhakti Krithis 

Muthuswamy Deekshitar visited Madurai for some time and composed two groups of kirthis on Meenakshi Amman: Maduramba(Meenakshi) Vibhakti kritis and Minakshi Devi krithis.

Madurai Meenakshi Devi Krithis

Tanjavur - Brihadeeswari Devi Krithis

Thiruvanaikaval - Akhilandeshwari Kritis

Vaidya Balambika Kritis

Kasi - Visalakshi / Annapurna Devi Kritis

Kumbhakonam - Mangalamba Krithis

Non-Kshetra kritis on Devi 
Misra Chapu

Navagraha Kritis
The kritis on the nine grahas of Jyotisha Shastra composed by Muthuswami Dikshitar are:

Shiva kritis

Pancha Bhoota Sthala Linga Kritis 
These 5 compositions are based on the 5 elements in Hinduism; namely, sky, water, earth, fire, and air. As such, the manifestations of Lord Shiva in each of these 5 elements is portrayed in these pieces.

Tiruvarur - Panchalinga Kritis

Tiruvarur - Thyagaraja Vibhakti Krithis 

Muthuswami Dikshitar composed 13 compositions in 8 Vibhaktis in praise of Sri Thyagarajeswara at Tiruvayur.

Mayuram - Mayuranatha Swami Krithis

Kanchi - Ekamranatheswra Krithis 

Deekshitar lived in Kanchi for a few years. During that time, he composed three krithis on Ekamreswara, several krithis on Kamakshi and a couple on Varadaraja Swami of Vishnu Kanchi.

Tanjavur - Brihadeeswara Krithis

Chidambaram - Nataraja Kritis

Chidambaram - Siva Kameswari Kritis

Chidambaram - Govinda Rajeswara Kritis

Tiruvaiyaru - Pranatartiharana Panchandishwara Kritis

Kasi - Visweswara / Kala Bhairava Kritis

Sri Vaidyanatha

Sri Rama Chandra Krithis

Sri Rama Chandra Vibhakti Krithis

Other Krithis on Sri Rama

Anjaneya Krithis

Sri Venkateswara Krithis

Sri Rangam Pancharatnam - Ranganatha Swami Krithis

Narasimha Swami Krithis

Sri Krishna Krithis

Sri Lakshmi Krithis

Saraswati Devi Krithis

English Notes

Non-group Krithis

See also
 List of compositions by Tyagaraja

References

External links 
Compositions of Dikshitar, with meanings.
Compositions of Dikshitar with meanings.
Statistics on Dikshitar's Compositions

Sources
 

Muthuswami Dikshitar
Muthuswami Dikshitar compositions